GTP:GTP guanylyltransferase may refer to:
 Guanosine-triphosphate guanylyltransferase, enzim
 Diguanylate cyclase, enzim